The Lost Masters may refer to:

 The Lost Masters (Bucks Fizz album), 2006
 The Lost Masters (Kool Keith album)
 The Lost Masters, Vol. 2, an album by Kool Keith
 The Lost Masters 1969–1972, a 1997 album by The New Kingston Trio